Francis Peter Higgins (16 November 1928 – 8 September 1993) was a British athlete who mainly competed in the 400 metres.

Athletics career
He competed for Great Britain in the 1956 Summer Olympics held in Melbourne, Australia where he won the bronze medal in the 4 x 400 metre relay with his team mates Michael Wheeler, John Salisbury and Derek Johnson.

He was also a 4×400 metres relay gold medallist for England at the 1954 British Empire and Commonwealth Games.

Personal life
He was born in Stockton-on-Tees and was also a Sports Teacher at Down Lane Central School, Tottenham, London, United Kingdom in the 1950s.

References

External links 
 
 

1928 births
1993 deaths
British male sprinters
English male sprinters
Olympic bronze medallists for Great Britain
Athletes (track and field) at the 1956 Summer Olympics
Olympic athletes of Great Britain
Sportspeople from Stockton-on-Tees
Athletes (track and field) at the 1954 British Empire and Commonwealth Games
Commonwealth Games medallists in athletics
Athletes from Yorkshire
Medalists at the 1956 Summer Olympics
Olympic bronze medalists in athletics (track and field)
Commonwealth Games gold medallists for England
Medallists at the 1954 British Empire and Commonwealth Games